Frankie Williams (born March 28, 1993) is an American professional football cornerback and kick returner for the Hamilton Tiger-Cats of the Canadian Football League (CFL). He played college football for the Purdue Boilermakers.

College career
Williams played four seasons at the Purdue University, where he appeared in 48 games (38 starts) and totaled 227 tackles (163 solo), 5.5 tackles for loss, 1.5 sacks, 36 passes defensed, 10 interceptions (one returned for a touchdown) one forced fumble and two fumble recoveries. He redshirted as a freshman with the  Boilermakers in 2011, then in 2012, he participated in all 13 games (five starts) and registered 45 tackles (36 solo), 1.0 tackle for loss, two interceptions and 11 passes defensed. He saw action in all 12 games (11 starts) in 2013 and finished with 61 tackles (46 solo), 2.0 tackles for loss, two interceptions and five passes defensed. In 2014, he started all 11 games he played and earned 74 tackles (51 solo), 1.5 tackles for loss, 1.0 sack, one fumble recovery, 10 passes defensed and three interceptions 
(one returned for a touchdown). As a redshirt senior in 2015, he appeared in 12 games (11 starts) and compiled 47 tackles (30 solo), 1.0 tackle for loss, half a sack, one forced fumble, one fumble recovery, 10 passes defensed and three interceptions.

Statistics
Source:

Professional career

Indianapolis Colts
Williams was signed by the Indianapolis Colts on May 7, 2016 as an undrafted free agent. He was waived on September 5, 2016 as part of final roster cuts and was signed to the practice squad the next day. He was promoted to the active roster on October 13, 2016. He was released on October 17, 2016 and re-signed to the practice squad the next day. He was promoted to the active roster on November 1, 2016. He was placed on the Reserve/Non-Football Injury list on November 23, 2016.

On May 15, 2017, Williams was waived/injured by the Colts and placed on injured reserve. He was waived from injured reserve on May 22, 2017 with an injury settlement.

Hamilton Tiger-Cats
On February 6, 2018, Williams signed with the Hamilton Tiger-Cats of the CFL. He re-signed with the Tiger-Cats on January 30, 2021.

References

External links
 Indianapolis Colts bio
 Purdue Boilermakers bio

1993 births
Living people
Players of American football from Tampa, Florida
Players of Canadian football from Tampa, Florida
American football cornerbacks
Purdue Boilermakers football players
Indianapolis Colts players
Hamilton Tiger-Cats players
Canadian football defensive backs
American players of Canadian football
Canadian football return specialists